Roseanne "Rose" Thomas (born 5 May 1992) in Abergavenny, Wales is a Welsh international field hockey player who plays as a goalkeeper for Wales and Great Britain.

She plays club hockey in the Women's England Hockey League Premier Division for Holcombe.

Thomas has also played for Wimbledon, Clifton, Lewes Hockey Club and Newport Ladies Hockey Club. 

She made her Wales full international debut in 2011 and as at 1 February 2018 she has 34 caps.

References

External links
 

1992 births
Living people
Welsh female field hockey players
British female field hockey players
Wimbledon Hockey Club players
Holcombe Hockey Club players
Women's England Hockey League players